At Carnegie Hall is the fifth live album by American singer Liza Minnelli. It was recorded in a three-week engagement at Carnegie Hall, New York City in 1987 and released the same year. Liza Minnelli's 17- day stint became the longest consecutive engagement in the hall's history. The album peaked at #156 in the Billboard 200 chart of popular music albums. A highlights version on a single CD containing 15 tracks was also released.

Track listing

Charts

References

Liza Minnelli live albums
1987 live albums
Albums recorded at Carnegie Hall